Katrina or Katrine is a feminine given name. It is a derivative of Katherine.
People with this name include:

People
 Katrina Adams (born 1968), American tennis player
 Katrina Asay (born 1957), American politician
 Katrina Bayonas (born 1941), English theatrical agent, producer and manager
 Katrina Begin (born 1982), American actress
 Katrina Best, British-born Canadian author of short stories
 Katrina Bowden (born 1988), American actress
 Katrina Boyd (born 1971), Australian soccer player
 Katrina Brown, English academic
 Katrina Bryan (born 1980), Scottish stage, film and television actress and CBeebies presenter
 Katrina Carlson, American singer-songwriter
 Katrina Jane Colebrook (born 1957), also known as Jane Colebrook, Jane Finch and Jane Weston, English track athlete
 Katrina Colleton (born 1971), American basketball player
 Katrina Conder, Australian television presenter
 Katrina del Mar, American filmmaker and photographer
 Katrina Devine (born 1980), New Zealand actor
 Katrina Rose Dideriksen (born 1983), American actress
 Katrina Dunn, Canadian actor and theatrical producer
 Katrina Edwards (1968–2014) American geomicrobiologist
 Katrina Elam (born 1983), American country music singer
 Katrina Fong Lim (born 1961), Lord Mayor of Darwin, Australia
 Katrina Forrester (born 1986), English political theorist and historian
 Katrina Gibbs (born 1959), Australian track and field athlete
 Katrine Gislinge (born 1969), Danish pianist
 Katrina Gorry (born 1992), Australian soccer player
 Katrina Grant (born 1987), New Zealand netball player
 Katrina Hacker (born 1990), American figure skater
 Katrina Halili (born 1986), Filipina actress
 Katrina Hart (born 1990), English Paralympic athlete
 Katrina Hertzer (1873 — 1960), American nurse during World War I
 Katrina Hibbert (born 1977), Australian basketball player
 Katrina Hodge (born 1987), British Army soldier and former Miss England winner
 Katrina Hodgkinson (born 1966), Australian politician
 Katrina Holden Bronson, American film director and actress                 
 Katrina Honeyman (1950–2011), British economic historian
 Katrina Infield (1978), better known as Katie Price, English television personality, businesswoman, former glamour model           
 Katrina Jacks (1986–2010), Welsh rower
 Katrina Johansson, American guitarist
 Katrina Johnson (born 1982), American actress
 Katrina McClain Johnson (born 1965), American basketball player
 Katrina Kaif (born 1983), model and Bollywood actor
 Katrina Karkazis, cultural and medical anthropologist
 Katrina Kendall (born 1989), Filipino-British environmental ambassador, scientist and former beauty queen
 Katrina Kittle, American novelist
 Katrina Keenan (born 1971), New Zealand cricketer
 Katrina Law (born 1985), American actress
 Katrina Legarda, Filipino lawyer and advocate
 Katrina Lehis (born 1994), Estonian épée fencer
 Katrina Leskanich (born 1960), American-born singer with Katrina and the Waves
 Katrina Leung (born 1954), Chinese American businesswoman and accused spy
 Katrina Ligett, American computer scientist
 Katrine Madsen (born 1972), Danish jazz singer
 Katrina Milosevic, Australian stage and television actor
 Katrina Mitchell (born 1964), better known as Katie Mitchell, English theatre director
 Katrina Molloy, New Zealand cricketer
 Katrina Mumaw, United States Air Force pilot
 Katrina Onstad, Canadian film critic and journalist
 Katrina Orpwood, Australian synchronized swimmer
 Katrina Parker, American singer
 Katrina Parrock (born 1990), Irish camogie player
 Katrina Patchett (born 1986), Australian ballroom dancer
 Katrina Porteous (born 1960), British poet, historian, and broadcaster
 Katrina Porter (born 1988), Australian swimmer
 Katrina Powell (born 1972), Australian field hockey player
 Katrina Price (1975-1999), American basketball player
 Katrina Retallick, Australian actor
 Katrina Scott, (born 2004), American tennis player 
 Katrina Sedgwick (born 1967), Australian museum and festival director
 Katrina Shankland (born 1987), American politician
 Katrina Shanks (born 1969), New Zealand politician
 Katrina Sharples, New Zealand biostatistician and violist
 Katrina Shealy (born 1954), American politician
 Katrina Skinke (born 1991), Latvian chess player
 Katrina Elayne Steward (born 1979), American choreographer and dancer
 Katrina Swett (born 1955), American politician and academic
 Katrina Szish, American television personality and journalist
 Katrina Laverne Taylor (born 1974), better known as Trina, American rapper and television personality
 Katrina Trask (1853-1922), American author and philanthropist
 Katrina vanden Heuvel (born 1959), American editor and publisher
 Katrina Von Sass (born 1972), Canadian volleyball player
 Katrina Voss, American broadcast meteorologist and science writer
 Katrina Warren (born 1967), veterinarian and television presenter
 Katrina Webb (born 1977), Australian Paralympic athlete
 Katrina Weidman (born 1983), American professional paranormal investigator
 Katrina Woolverton (born 1977), American singer-songwriter; born "Katrina Abrahemian" and known mononymously as "Katrina"
 Katrina Zepps (1918–1980), Australian nurse and educator

Fictional characters
 Katrina, character in Lois Lowry's novel Gathering Blue
 Katrina, character in the Inheritance Cycle by Christopher Paolini
 Katrina, character in the Quest for Glory universe
 Katrina Evans, character in the soap opera Brookside
 Katrina Silber, minor recurring character in Buffy the Vampire Slayer
 Katrina Spellman, doppelgänger of the protagonist in Sabrina, the Teenage Witch
 Katrina Luisa Van Horn, also known as Man-Killer, Marvel Universe supervillain
 Katrina Van Tassel, in Washington Irving's The Legend of Sleepy Hollow
 Katrina de Voort, antagonist in the 2007 film Juno
Katrina Fisher, mermaid warrior, a main character in the second season of 2018 Freeform show Siren

See also

 Katrina (disambiguation) 
 Catrina (disambiguation)

References

Feminine given names
Given names
English feminine given names

de:Katrina
nl:Katrina
ja:カトリーナ
sk:Katrina